The Toshiba Pasopia IQ are a series of MSX compatible machines released by Toshiba between 1983 and 1985. This is not to be confused with a different computer line (unrelated to MSX) with the similar name of Toshiba Pasopia.

HX-10 series
The HX-10 was released in the fall of 1983. There is only one ROM cartridge slot, but there's an optional expansion slot available. Several models exist (D, DP, DPN, F, E and S), targeting different markets. For example, the HX-10DPN is equipped with an RGB 21-pin terminal, but other connections (RF, composite video) are non existing; the HX-10S only has 16KB of RAM.

HX-20 series
The HX-20 was released in the fall of 1984 is equipped with 64KB of RAM. It has a monaural / stereo sound selector switch. Like with the HX-10 series, several models exist (HX-21, HX-22, HX-23). The later models have a RGB 21-pin video output. The HX-23 is compatible with the MSX2 and comes with VRAM 64KB of VRAM. The HX-23F is equipped with a RS-232 interface and comes with 128KB of VRAM.

HX-30 series
The HX-30 was MSX compatible and released in 1985, with 16KB of RAM, with latter models coming with 64KB, a RGB 21-pin video output and Programmable sound generator stereo output.
The HX-33 model has 128kB of VRAM and was MSX2 compatible with integrated keyboard. The next model, HX-34, added a floppy disk drive.

Model list

The following table present a condensed model list of the MSX compatible computers released by Toshiba.

MSX 1 compatible

MSX 2 compatible

See also 
 Toshiba Pasopia
 Toshiba Pasopia 5
 Toshiba Pasopia 7
 Toshiba Pasopia 16

References 

Pasopia
MSX